Sylvirana is a genus of true frogs, family Ranidae, found in South and East Asia, from northeastern India in west to China in the north, Taiwan in the east, and Thailand in the south. Originally proposed as a subgenus of Rana in 1992, it has been considered both a full genus and a synonym of Hylarana. Its current recognition at generic level stems from molecular genetic analyses published in 2015.

Description
Sylvirana are generally medium-size frogs with robust bodies. They have similar postocular masks as in Papurana. The upper lip is gray, off-white, or occasionally, mottled. The dorsum is shagreened with spicules, or it can be warty. The dorsolateral folds a medium-sized and well-developed, either pale or the same color as the dorsum. The flanks have dark coloration below lateral ridges that fades to pale with well-defined dark spots. Males have paired vocal sac that may be internal or external.

Species
There are 12 recognized species:

References

 
True frogs
Amphibian genera
Amphibians of Asia